Burnfoot is a hamlet in the Scottish Borders area of Scotland, close to Roberton, by the Borthwick Water. The nearest town is Hawick to the east, and other places nearby include the Alemoor Loch, Branxholme, Broadhaugh, the Craik Forest. The meaning of Burnfoot is "Place at the foot of the burn".

See also
List of places in the Scottish Borders
List of places in Scotland

External links
RCAHMS record for Burnfoot, Roberton, Scottish Borders
Old Roads of Scotland: Craik Cross to Hawick via Roberton and Burnfoot
Hawick Cycle Trail via Burnfoot and Roberton
Water and Environment Journal: Survey of Sheep-Dipping Practices in the River Tweed Catchment (pollution)
The Non-Celtic Place-Names of the Scottish Border Counties, by May G. Williamson, University of Edinburgh, 1942

Villages in the Scottish Borders